Ammonium iodide is the chemical compound NH4I. It is used in photographic chemicals and some medications. It can be prepared by the action of hydroiodic acid on ammonia. It is easily soluble in water, from which it crystallizes in cubes. It is also soluble in ethanol. It gradually turns yellow on standing in moist air, owing to decomposition with liberation of iodine.

Preparation

Ammonium iodide can be made in lab by reacting ammonia or ammonium hydroxide with hydroiodic acid or hydrogen iodide gas:

NH3 + HI → NH4I

NH4OH + HI → NH4I + H2O

It is also formed by the decomposition of ammoniated nitrogen triiodide (an explosive).

References

Iodides
Nonmetal halides
Ammonium compounds